Robert V. Derrah was an American architect. His work included designs for the Crossroads of the World (1936), Coca-Cola Building (Los Angeles) and a 1942 extension on the Southern California Gas Company Complex.

He died at the age of 51 in 1946.

Work
Crossroads of the World (1936), one of America's first outdoor shopping malls, 6671 Sunset Boulevard at Las Palmas, Los Angeles. Listed on the National Register of Historic Places.
Coca-Cola Building (Los Angeles) (1939), 1334 South Central Avenue
Southern California Gas Company Complex (1942), Art Deco style six story extension at 820 S. Flower Street including two concrete side sections that curve into the recessed glass center.
five unit Colonial courtyard building (1935) on Durant Drive in Beverly Hills, targeted for demolition
Mrs. Lillian M. Rose house (1934), a Monterey architecture style house at 842 South Citrus Avenue in Mid-City.

References

20th-century American architects
1890s births
1946 deaths
Year of birth uncertain